Cameron Delaney may refer to:
Cameron Delaney (swimmer) (born 1980), Australian swimmer
Cameron Delaney (footballer) (born 1992), Australian rules footballer
Cameron Delaney (basketball) (born 1995), American basketball player